Brookesmith Independent School District is a public school district based in the community of Brookesmith, Texas (USA).  Located in Brown County, a small portion of the district extends into Mills County.

Academic achievement
In 2009, the school district was rated "academically acceptable" by the Texas Education Agency.

Schools
Brookesmith ISD has two campuses - 
Brookesmith High School (Grades 9-12) 
Brookesmith Elementary School (Grades PK-8)

Special programs

Athletics
Brooksmith High School plays six-man football.

See also

List of school districts in Texas 
List of high schools in Texas

References

External links
Brookesmith ISD

School districts in Brown County, Texas
School districts in Mills County, Texas